Brian Arthur Hemmings FRS is a British biochemist, and Senior Group Leader, at the Friedrich Miescher Institute for Biomedical Research. He is a member of the Faculty of 1000.

Education
He was educated at the University of Nottingham (BSc, 1972) and the University of East Anglia (PhD, 1975).

References

Living people
Alumni of the University of Nottingham
Alumni of the University of East Anglia
Fellows of the Royal Society
Members of the European Molecular Biology Organization
British biochemists
Year of birth missing (living people)